Rough Creek is a stream in Ste. Genevieve County in the U.S. state of Missouri. It is a tributary of Jonca Creek.

Rough Creek was so named on account of the uneven terrain near its course.

See also
List of rivers of Missouri

References

Rivers of Ste. Genevieve County, Missouri
Rivers of Missouri